Vasiliy Viktorovich Sidorenko (born 1 May 1961 in Volgograd) is a retired male hammer thrower who represented the USSR and later Russia. He is the 1994 European champion and won a bronze medal at the 1997 World Championships. His personal best throw is 82.54 metres, achieved in 1992.

International competitions

References

sports-reference

1961 births
Living people
Sportspeople from Volgograd
Soviet male hammer throwers
Russian male hammer throwers
Olympic male hammer throwers
Olympic athletes of Russia
Athletes (track and field) at the 1996 Summer Olympics
Athletes (track and field) at the 2000 Summer Olympics
Goodwill Games medalists in athletics
Competitors at the 1998 Goodwill Games
Competitors at the 1994 Goodwill Games
World Athletics Championships athletes for Russia
World Athletics Championships medalists
European Athletics Championships winners
European Athletics Championships medalists
Russian Athletics Championships winners